"Happier" is a song by English singer-songwriter Ed Sheeran. The song was written by Sheeran along with Ryan Tedder and Benny Blanco. It was included on his third studio album, ÷ (2017). After the album's release, it charted at number 6 on the UK Singles Chart. It was released in Italy on 27 April 2018 as the fourth (fifth overall) and the final single from the album.

Composition
According to Sheeran, the theme of the song is about looking back at an early relationship and, despite being initially angry and bitter at the breakup, later coming to realise that his first love was happier  with someone else. He said: "I remember the first girl I was with, that the first and most of the second album was about, that I was with from school. And I remember the guy she was with, meeting him one day and being like, he is so much suited to her than I ever was. Seeing them together they were happy together, we never looked like that, we were never that couple, we were never that happy. So it was having a kind of epiphany moment, and writing a song that was basically that."

"Happier" was written in the key of C major with a tempo of 90 beats per minute. The song was composed in common time ( time).

Critical reception
Taylor Weatherby of Billboard described it as the "most heartbreaking track" and "perhaps one of the prettiest songs" on the album. She noted the track's melodic similarity to Sam Smith's 2014 songs "Stay with Me" and "Like I Can".

Music video
The official video for "Happier" was released on Ed Sheeran's YouTube account on 27 April 2018.
It was directed by Emil Nava, and features a puppet caricature of Sheeran from the music video of his single "Sing" sad about the other is about his balloon girlfriend with another puppet and ends with the balloon girl flying away.

Formats and track listings

Charts

Weekly charts

Year-end charts

Certifications

Release history

References

2017 songs
2018 singles
Ed Sheeran songs
Song recordings produced by Benny Blanco
Songs written by Benny Blanco
Songs written by Ed Sheeran
Songs written by Ryan Tedder
Music videos featuring puppetry
Asylum Records singles
Atlantic Records singles
Pop ballads
2010s ballads